Mahmoud Goudarzi (born c. 1955) is an Iranian politician and former wrestler. He had served as the Minister of Youth Affairs and Sports of Iran from 17 November 2013 until 19 October 2016.

Career
From 1969 to 1978, Goudarsi was a freestyle wrestler. From 1980 to 1982, Goudarsi was the president of Shooting Federation of Iran and later served as the vice president of Physical Education Organization of the Islamic Republic of Iran and a full professorship at the University of Tehran.

References

External links

People from Malayer
Living people
Iranian Vice Ministers
Government ministers of Iran
1955 births
Iranian sportsperson-politicians
Iranian male sport wrestlers
20th-century Iranian people
21st-century Iranian people